The Chrysler E-Class was a mid-size car produced by Chrysler. Introduced in 1983 on a stretched version of the Chrysler K platform, the E-Class was a less expensive, less equipped version of the similar 1983 New Yorker.

History

The Chrysler E-Class was targeted at those who wanted Chrysler luxury at a more affordable price than the flagship New Yorker. Due to this reason, the E-Class is the de facto replacement for the 1981 Newport, which had been Chrysler's cheaper, more basic version of the New Yorker. The E-Class was originally to be called the "Grand LeBaron", however Chrysler decided to name it "E-Class" in reference to the new E-platform.

The E-Class came with a number of features and options including a cassette player, split 50/50 front bench with middle seat mounted console, woodgrain interior trim, two-tone exterior paint, power window & door locks, and air conditioning. Engines were the 2.2 L naturally aspirated I4 and the Mitsubishi 2.6 L I4. 1984 saw the debut of fuel injection on the 2.2 L engine and an optional Garrett AiResearch T-03 turbocharger. Larger, wraparound tail lights were also added for 1984.

The E-Class however, was not a sales success. Sales of the more expensive New Yorker were nearly double the E-Class's sales for 1984. Its slow sales caused it to be dropped from Chrysler's lineup after only two years on the market. Rather than discontinue a lower-priced model to be sold on Chrysler-Plymouth lots, Chrysler gave the car a minor refreshment (it lost the waterfall grille and crystal pentastar hood ornament) and transferred it to Plymouth's lineup, where it became the Caravelle for 1985.

Sales

References

 

E-Class
Front-wheel-drive vehicles
Mid-size cars
Sedans
1980s cars
Cars introduced in 1983
Cars discontinued in 1984